City View can mean:

City View, Ottawa, a neighbourhood in Ottawa
City View, South Carolina, a town in South Carolina